8/7 may refer to:
August 7 (month-day date notation)
July 8 (day-month date notation)